Cornelis Willem Hoevenaar (1802, Utrecht – 1873, Utrecht), was a 19th-century painter from the Northern Netherlands.

Biography

According to the RKD he learned to paint from his father, the painter Adriaenus Hoevenaar and later Christiaan van Geelen. His brothers Willem Pieter and Nicolaas Ludolph were also painters. He became a member of the Royal Academy in Amsterdam in 1847. His son Cornelis Willem Hoevenaar the younger also became a painter. Like his brother Willem Pieter, he is known for genre works with figures, often portrayed in vintage Dutch costumes, but he also made fruit and flower still lifes and church interiors.

References

 
website with Hoevenaar family history
Cornelis Willem Hoevenaar the elder on Artnet

1802 births
1873 deaths
19th-century Dutch painters
Dutch male painters
Artists from Utrecht
19th-century Dutch male artists